TD/SMP, short for Terminal Device/Session Management Protocol, was a terminal multiplexer system introduced by DEC on their VT330/340 terminals in 1987. The terminal-side was referred to as SSU. TD/SMP allowed data from two separate host sessions to be sent to a compatible computer terminal over a single serial port. The format was patented and never described in depth, limiting it to DEC's own terminal servers and terminals.

References

Computer-related introductions in 1987
Digital Equipment Corporation
Terminal multiplexers